Andrew Weiss is an American musician, composer, audio engineer and Grammy-winning record producer.

Life and career
Born in Chicago, Weiss spent most of his youth growing up in central New Jersey where he later started playing bass with local bands while attending Princeton High School. In 1982 he teamed up with William Tucker (guitar) and high school buddy Sim Cain (drums) to form Regressive Aid, an instrumental new wave band that released a 4-song EP in 1983 and a 6-song LP the following year. Around this time, Weiss began his experimentations with electronic music and recording. This led to a collaboration with his friend Jeff Rusnack, partnersinWonder, and together they founded Bird'o'Pray Records, a cassette only label that featured electronic and alternative music, including the first releases by the New Hope, Pa. duo Ween.

In 1985, Regressive Aid caught the attention of Black Flag founder/guitarist Greg Ginn who then recruited Weiss and Sim to travel to Los Angeles and form Gone, an instrumental punk/jazz power trio. In 1986 Gone recorded 3 albums for SST Records and played over 500 gigs throughout the USA touring in support of Black Flag as well as performing guerrilla type shows in record stores. The end of the year saw the demise of both Gone and Black Flag, at which point Weiss and Sim teamed up with Black Flag vocalist Henry Rollins and Washington DC guitarist Chris Haskett to form the Rollins Band. It was also around this time that Weiss began to further pursue adventures in music production and engineering, enlisting Ween and local NJ act Skunk as guinea pigs. In 1989, he produced and engineered albums for both bands which were subsequently snatched up by the Minneapolis indie label Twin Tone. Soon thereafter, he also produced a duo project with Rollins for Chrysalis Records, dubbed Wartime, on which Weiss wrote, played, and recorded all the music himself while Henry wrote the lyrics and performed the vocals.

From 1987 through 1992, Weiss toured the world and recorded 7 albums with the Rollins Band acting not only as their bassist, but writing much of the music as well. During this period he also produced four albums for Ween, two for Skunk, and participated in 3 tours and 4 albums as bassist and songwriter for the industrial all-star supergroup Pigface. In 1992, Weiss departed the Rollins Band to devote more time to Ween (as their live bassist) and Pigface projects. The years since have found him recording and playing bass with, among others, the Butthole Surfers, Chris Harford and Yoko Ono (with whom he did a world tour in 1996), while continuing his production/engineering work with Ween (six more releases), a collaboration with the premier Japanese band Boredoms (Z-Rock Hawaii), the 'P' album (featuring Johnny Depp, Gibby Haynes, Flea, Steve Jones, & others), Yoko Ono, and Akron/Family. 

Weiss is also well known in Central and South America as producer and engineer of albums for a number of Latin American bands including six albums with Babasonicos from Argentina, four with Mexican band Liquits, and the Grammy winning 2003 album from Cafe Tacuba, Quatro Caminos. In 2000, Weiss started spending time in Haiti recording and performing with Port-au-Prince post-racine band RAM. Around this time he also began composing music for television and film, most notably scoring music for a multitude of shows on the Sundance Channel. Weiss' most recent work was being the bassist with Jello Biafra and the Guantanamo School of Medicine. Weiss is still maintaining his Zion House'o'Flesh studio in New Jersey.

Partial discography

External links

References

American rock bass guitarists
American male bass guitarists
Jewish American musicians
Jewish heavy metal musicians
Year of birth missing (living people)
Living people
Record producers from Illinois
Pigface members
Ween members
Alternative metal bass guitarists
Guitarists from Chicago
American male guitarists
Rollins Band members
Jello Biafra and the Guantanamo School of Medicine members